Jazzmarr Ferguson (born March 22, 1989) is an American professional basketball player for Saint-Vallier of the Pro B.

Professional career
Ferguson went undrafted in the 2011 NBA draft. He signed his first Pro contract with Moncton Miracles of the NBL Canada. After the end of the Canadian season, he moved to Australia, finalizing a deal with Albury Wodonga Bandits of the SEABL, the second-tier Australian League. The following season, he joined the Bendigo Braves, in the same league.

On August 29, 2013 he signed in Italy with Fulgor Libertas Forlì in the second Italian league. Here he plays 29 games averaging 17.6 points and 2.7 assists per game shooting an excellent 41.8% from behind the arc.

On July 28, 2014 he reached an agreement with Vanoli Cremona of Serie A, the top Italian league.

On July 2, 2018 he signed to Tezenis Verona of Serie A2, the second tier Italian league.

In 2019–2020 season he played at the Assigeco Piacenza of Serie A2, the second tier Italian league. Ferguson averaged 21.6 points, 3.4 rebounds, 3.1 assists and 1.4 steals per game. On October 4, 2020, he signed with Charilaos Trikoupis of the Greek Basket League. He left Trikoupis during December and joined Enosis Neon Paralimni of the Cypriot League on December 26,2020. 

in August 2022, he signed a new contract with Saint Vallier Basket Drome, Pro B Team SVBD  France.

References

External links
Profile at Eurobasket.com
RealGM.com Profile

1989 births
Living people
American expatriate basketball people in Australia
American expatriate basketball people in Canada
American expatriate basketball people in Italy
American men's basketball players
Basketball players from Louisville, Kentucky
Charilaos Trikoupis B.C. players
Fulgor Libertas Forlì players
Indiana–Southeast Grenadiers men's basketball players
Junior college men's basketball players in the United States
Moncton Miracles players
Pallacanestro Biella players
Pallacanestro Mantovana players
Point guards
Scaligera Basket Verona players
Vanoli Cremona players